Marion Township is located in Lee County, Illinois. As of the 2010 census, its population was 232 and it contained 114 housing units. Marion Township formed from parts of Hamilton Township and Amboy Township in September, 1854.

Geography

Demographics

References

External links
 US Census
 City-data.com
 Cook County Official Site
 Illinois State Archives

Townships in Lee County, Illinois
1854 establishments in Illinois
Populated places established in 1854
Townships in Illinois